Algoforma is a genus of moths of the family Tortricidae.

Species
Algoforma algoana (Felder & Rogenhofer, 1875)
Algoforma paralgoana Razowski, 2005

See also
List of Tortricidae genera

References

 , 2005: Tortricidae (Lepidoptera) from South Africa. 1: Tortricini and Cochylini. Polish Journal of Entomology 74 (4): 495–508.

External links

tortricidae.com

Tortricini
Tortricidae genera
Taxa named by Józef Razowski